Dudanlu (also Romanized as Dūdānlū and Do Dānlū) is a village in Takab Rural District, in the Central District of Dargaz County, Razavi Khorasan Province, Iran. At the 2006 census, its population was 155, with 44 families.

See also

References 

Populated places in Dargaz County